Local elections will be held in the Gambia on 13 May 2023.

References

Local
Local elections in the Gambia
Gambia
Gambia